Since 1967, Mauritius has experienced 12 free and fair democratic general elections to choose a government.

The National Assembly has 70 members elected for a five-year term, 62 by plurality in 21 multi-member constituencies and 8 additional "best loser" members.

The government is formed by the party or group which controls a majority on the unicameral legislature. The president and vice-president are then elected by the National Assembly for a five-year term by the parliament. 

On a regional level, the country has village & district councils, and municipal elections every 6 years.

Mauritius has a multi-party system which is mainly dominated by three parties namely Militant Socialist Movement (MSM), the Labour Party and Mauritian Militant Movement (MMM).

Out of the 12 national elections, the MSM has won 6 (1983, 1987, 1991, 2000, 2014 and 2019), the Labour Party won 4 (1967, 1995, 2005 and 2010) and the MMM won 2 (1976 and 1982). The premiership of the country has alternated between two dynasties, namely Ramgoolam and Jugnauth, except for a short period of 2003-2005 where Paul Berenger was prime minister under an alliance with the Jugnauths.

Electoral system
Of the 70 MPs, 62 are elected by plurality in 21 multi-member electoral districts: 20 districts with 3 members each and one district (Rodrigues) with 2 members. Voters can vote for up to 3 (or 2) candidates in their district. (There is malapportionment: the number of voters per district varies widely.) 

An additional 8 "best losers" are elected so as to balance the ethnic breakdown of the 62 already elected MPs. Every "best loser" seat is awarded to the community which is the most underrepresented community at that stage of the process. The D'Hondt method is applied. The basic figures used to apportion the best losers come from the 1972 census (since then, the census doesn't ask for ethnicity): 428348 Hindu, 261439 Muslim, 24374 Sino-Mauritian and 137173 'general population'. The first four seats are apportioned to the best losers of the relevant community, irrespective of party. The next four best losers also compensate on the party-level: after the first four best loser seats, the next seat must go to the majority party until is has four, the remaining seats go to parties who did net yet receive seats. This makes it sometimes impossible to fill a vacancy, because there is no candidate available who is from ethnic group A *and* from party B at the same time.

For the 2014 elections only, the obligation for candidates to declare their community was lifted. If such candidates got elected (which was the case for 5 MPs from L'Alliance Lepep), instead of the actual division of the 62 seats over the communities, the historic average was used as basis for the best loser allocation.

Main political parties 

 The Labour Party is the oldest surviving political party on the island and remains one of the main parties on the political front. It was formed in 1936 by a group of people including Maurice Curé, Renganaden Seeneevasen, Mamode Hassenjee and Emmanuel Anquetil, Jean Prosper, Hassenjee Jeetoo, Barthelemy Ohsan, Samuel Barbe, Godefroy Moutia and Pandit Sahadeo. It was later led by Seewoosagur Ramgoolam from 1948. The Labour Party formed an alliance with the Comité d'Action Musulman (CAM) and the Independent Forward Bloc (IFB) to form the Independence Party alliance in 1967. This alliance negotiated the terms of the 1968 independence at the end of British colonial rule in the country. The Independence Party alliance won the elections of 1967. In 1969 Sookdeo Bissoondoyal's IFB left the government to join the Opposition which allowed Gaetan Duval's PMSD to join the ruling government. This Labour-CAM-PMSD coalition passed a Bill in Parliament to postpone the 1972 elections to 4 years later in 1976. Due to a struggling economy and worsening unemployment from 1971 and onwards the Labour Party suffered a first electoral defeat in 1976. However it managed to stay in power by forming another alliance with the PMSD. It finally suffered a major electoral defeat in 1982 and Seewoosagur Ramgoolam eventually resigned as Leader in the following year. From 1983 to 1991, Satcam Boolell was leader of the Labour Party which supported the MSM-led government from 1983 to 1988. Prior to the 1991 general elections Seewoosagur's son Navin Ramgoolam replaced Satcam Boolell as the party's leader in 1990. He restructured the Labour Party eventually won the 1995 elections after contracting an alliance with the MMM. After the party lost in 2000, it came back in 2005 and won again the elections of 2010. The Labour Party then suffered two consecutive defeats at both the 2014 and 2019 general elections.
 Parti Mauricien Social Démocrate (PMSD) is the second oldest surviving main political party formed in 1955 by Jules Koenig. The party was considered a main political force up to 1982. In the 1960s, the PMSD was opposed to the concept of an independent Mauritius. Led by Gaëtan Duval in 1967 it waged an electoral campaign against its main rival, the Independence Party (Labour-IFB-CAM) which featured divisive slogans such as "Malbar Nou Pas Oulé" which translates into "We do not want Hindus". Following its electoral defeat in 1967, it nevertheless joined the Labour Party to form a unified government in 1971 and again in 1976. In 1982 the Labour-PMSD alliance suffered a major electoral defeat. From 1983 to 1990, it supported the MSM-led government. In 1991, PMSD formed an alliance with the Labour Party once again but they lost the 1991 elections. Due to infighting in the 1990s both Xavier Luc Duval and his father Gaëtan Duval had left the PMSD to form their own parties. In 2000 the PMSD returned as a minor partner in the MSM-MMM government with Maurice Allet as leader. In 2005 Allet stepped down to make way for Xavier Luc Duval as leader of the PMSD following dissolution of Xavier's short-lived break away party Parti Mauricien Xavier Duval (PMXD). Although since 1983 PMSD had become a minor political party (having generally not more than 4 Members of Parliament), it managed to have 11 Members of Parliament elected at the 2014 elections. PMSD continues to play an active role in the politics of dependency Rodrigues.
 Mouvement Militant Mauricien (MMM) was formed in 1969 by Paul Berenger, Dev Virahsawmy, Zeel Peerun, Jooneed Jeeroburkhan, Fareed Muttur, Chafeekh Jeeroburkhan, Sushil Kushiram, Tirat Ramkissoon, Krishen Mati, Ah-Ken Wong, Kriti Goburdhun, Allen Sew Kwan Kan, Vela Vengaroo, and Amedee Darga as a student activist movement and is still led by the same man. Berenger collaborated with trade unions such as GWF to fight for the rights of workers to obtain fairer compensation & salary. As a trade unionist, he was the mastermind of a series of strikes in the 1970s against political injustice and government domination. Most prominent figures of the MMM (such as Ramesh Fulena, Berenger, and others) spent most of 1972 in the secret police's jail of Line Barracks for organising illegal gathering during which he also made public speech. The first ever elected member of the MMM was Dev Virahsawmy following by-elections triggered by the death in 1970 of Lall Jugnauth who had been elected member of parliament under the banner of now defunct party Independent Forward Block (IFB). Ramgoolam decided not to host the 1972 general elections, saying there was too much social unrest. Dev Virahsawmy and many others left the MMM in March 1973. Soon afterwards Dev Virahsawmy formed a new party Mouvement Militant Mauricien Socialiste Progressiste (MMMSP). At the 1976 elections the MMM came out with the largest number of winning votes but S. Ramgoolam made a surprise alliance with PMSD to outnumber MMM. The Labour-PMSD coalition was thus returned to government and MMM became the main Opposition. In 1982 Berenger eventually led to the downfall of the Labour-PMSD coalition government as MMM won (with an alliance with Harish Boodhoo's PSM) all parliamentary seats. Seewoosagur Ramgoolam was not even elected in 1982. Thus by 1982 MMM had won a second general election with a clear majority. Then party leader Anerood Jugnauth became prime minister. In 1983 following numerous disagreements between Jugnauth and Berenger, the MMM decided to leave the government. Jugnauth, along with the PSM and some members of the MMM who did not leave him formed a minority government. In August 1983, Jugnauth formed his own party (MSM) and won the further elections of 1983 and 1987. The MMM then formed an alliance with the MSM again in 1991 and with the Labour Party in 1995 (both times as a junior partner). In 2000 it formed a coalition government with the MSM as a rather equal partner. Berenger finally became Prime Minister in 2003 following Jugnauth's retirement. He then formed his own government from 2003 to 2005. The MMM later lost the 2005, 2010 and 2014 elections (3 general elections in a row).
 Mouvement Socialiste Militant (MSM) is the latest main political party formed in 1983. It was formed and led by Sir Anerood Jugnauth and consisted of members of the defunct Parti Socialist Mauricien (PSM) of Harish Boodhoo, the remnants of the Independent Forward Block and dissident members of the MMM who did not agree with Berenger. It is the only party which won three general elections in a row (1983, 1987 & 1991). It restructured the country's struggling economy following the Labour Party-PMSD government which lost power in 1982. MSM received support from various parties over time including the Labour Party from 1983 to 1985, 1987–1990, the PMSD from 1983 to 1988 and the MMM from 1990 to 1993. The country experienced a major economic boom after 1982 due to innovative policies and Jugnauth's style of management. The country moved from an underdeveloped to a developing economy during these years. Its main electorate is rural-based and therefore competes with the Labour Party for the majority Hindu votes. A significant portion of MSM's current electoral base is actually made up of the rural electorate which dissented from the MMM in 1983. Due to their common origins, the MSM and the MMM formed political alliance at various reprises (reuniting the big 'militant' family) in 1991, 1999, 2000 and from 2012 to 2014. In 2000, Jugnauth and the MSM made a historical deal with the MMM in which Jugnauth agreed to retire from politics and eventually resign as prime minister after serving 3 years (in a 5-year term) to allow Berenger to become Prime Minister for the lasting 2 years. The main reason for SAJ's retirement was for his son Pravind Jugnauth to enter politics and lead the MSM. The younger Jugnauth later became Deputy Prime Minister and has led the MSM since 2003. Sir Anerood Jugnauth was elected to serve as president in 2003 and again in 2008. He remained President until major disagreements were experienced between him and the Labour-led government by Navin Ramgoolam especially as the Medpoint scandal case came to light. He later resigned and joined back politics (putting an end to his retirement after 9 years). The MSM finally won the 2014 and 2019 general elections with an alliance with various smaller parties.

From 1967 onwards all general elections have been won by a coalition of parties led by either the Labour Party (led by the Ramgoolams) or the MSM (led by the Jugnauths). The following politicians held the office of Prime Minister:

Elections

1967 general election 

In the 1967 general election, an alliance known as the Independence Party consisting of the Labour Party (Parti Travailliste — PTR), Independent Forward Bloc (IFB) and Comité d'Action Musulman (CAM) won the election. Sir Seewoosagur Ramgoolam (SSR) became the first Prime Minister of Mauritius. The Parti Mauricien Social Démocrate (PMSD) became the opposition party.

1976 general election 

In the 1976 general election, the Mouvement Militant Mauricien (MMM) won the majority of the seats, however a coalition government was formed by the Independence Party (consisting of the Labour Party and Comité d'Action Musulman) and the PMSD. SSR remained in office. The MMM became the opposition party.

1982 general election 

In the 1982 general election, an alliance consisting of the MMM and the Parti Socialiste Mauricien (PSM) won the election. Sir Anerood Jugnauth (SAJ) became Prime Minister, Harish Boodhoo became Deputy Prime Minister and Paul Bérenger became Minister of Finance. The PMSD became the opposition party.

1983 general election 

The alliance broke up in 1983 and the 1983 general election was held. A new alliance consisting of the PTR, the Mouvement Socialiste Militant (MSM) and the PMSD won the election, SAJ became Prime Minister again. The MMM became the opposition party.

1987 general election 

In the 1987 general election, an alliance known as Alliance consisting of the PTR, the MSM and the PMSD won the election, SAJ remained Prime Minister. The MMM remained the opposition party.

1991 general election 

In the 1991 general election, an alliance consisting of the MMM and MSM was established again and won the election, SAJ remained Prime Minister. The PTR became the opposition, with the new leader of the PTR Dr. Navin Ramgoolam, as the leader of the opposition.

Republic of Mauritius 
On 12 March 1992 Mauritius became a republic, with a new constitution, the terms of the general elections were regulated to 5 years. Since then, every 5 years elections take place and a new prime minister is elected.

1995 general election 

In the 1995 general election an alliance consisting of the PTR and MMM won the election, Dr. Navin Ramgoolam became Prime Minister of Mauritius. The PMSD became the opposition party.

2000 general election 

In the 2000 general election an alliance MMM-MSM was formed and won the election, the PTR became the opposition party. The alliance of the MMM-MSM made an agreement, SAJ resigned as Prime Minister after 3 years to allow the Deputy Prime Minister and Minister of Finance Paul Bérenger to take over. Paul Bérenger became the first non-Hindu prime minister of Mauritius. SAJ was nominated as president of Mauritius by the National Assembly. The son of SAJ, Pravind Jugnauth was then elected as deputy prime minister, SAJ also left the reins of the Mouvement Socialiste Militant to his son.

2005 general election 

In the 2005 general election an alliance known as Alliance Sociale was formed, it consisted of the PTR, the Parti Mauricien Xavier-Luc Duval (PMXD), Les Verts Fraternels, the Mouvement Républicain and Mouvement Militant Socialiste Mauricien (MMSM). Another alliance was the MMM-MSM which included the MMM, the MSM and the PMSD. The Alliance Sociale won the election and Dr. Navin Ramgoolam became Prime Minister of Mauritius.

In 2009, the PMSD merged with the PMXD, the new party retained the name PMSD, Xavier-Luc Duval became leader of the new party and Maurice Allet became president.

2010 general election 

For the 2010 general election, two alliances were formed before the election, the Alliance de L'Avenir consisting of the PTR, the PMSD and the MSM. The other alliance was the Alliance du Coeur which consisted of the MMM, the Union Nationale and the Mouvement Mauricien Socialiste Démocrate (MMSD). The Alliance de L'Avenir won the election, Dr. Navin Ramgoolam remained the prime minister of Mauritius. Then the MSM and later the PMSD left the government.

2014 general election 

L'Alliance Lepep won the 2014 elections, with 47 seats, against 13 for the Labour Party / MMM alliance.

2019 general election 

The Alliance Morisien won the 2019 elections after 39 of its candidates were elected, and thanks to the Best Loser system it secured an additional 3 seats. On the other hand 13 candidates of the rival Alliance Nationale were elected, with an additional 4 seats granted by the Electoral Commission. The MMM managed to have 8 of its candidates elected and received 1 extra seat as part of Best Loser system.

See also 
 List of political parties in Mauritius
 Electoral calendar
 Electoral system

External links 
 Adam Carr's Election Archive
 African Elections Database

References